Melbourne Girls Grammar (also known as MGGS, and earlier as MCEGGS), is an independent, Anglican, day and boarding school for girls, located in South Yarra, an inner city suburb of Melbourne, Victoria, Australia.

Founded in 1893 by Emily Hensley and Alice Taylor, the school has a non-selective enrolment policy and caters for 1,010 students from Early Learning to Year 12, including 90 boarders. It was originally known as Merton Hall and then as Melbourne Church of England Girls Grammar School.

Melbourne Girls Grammar is affiliated with the Association of Heads of Independent Schools of Australia (AHISA), the Junior School Heads Association of Australia (JSHAA), the Alliance of Girls' Schools Australasia (AGSA), the Association of Independent Schools of Victoria (AISV), the Australian Boarding Schools Association (ABSA), and is a founding member of Girls Sport Victoria (GSV).

History

Melbourne Girls Grammar was founded in 1893, as a private school known as Merton Hall in Domain Road, South Yarra, by Emily Hensley and Alice Taylor. In 1900, the School moved to its current location in Anderson Street, and in 1903 it became the first girls' school to be owned by the Anglican Diocese of Melbourne.

Merton Hall, now the main senior campus, was named after the house in Cambridge, England, where Newnham College began.

The tenth headmistress of Melbourne Girls Grammar, Christine Briggs, announced her retirement in 2007. Catherine Misson was appointed to the position of Principal in 2008 serving until 2019, when Dr Toni Meath, previously principal at Mac.Robertson Girls' High School, was appointed as the twelfth Principal of the Melbourne Girls Grammar.

Headmistresses and Principals
 Emily Hensley 1893–1898 and Alice Taylor 1893–1895 
 Mary Morris 1898–1907 and Edith Morris 1898–1912
 Agnes Tunnicliffe 1914–1915
 Kathleen Gilman Jones 1916–1938
 Dorothy Ross 1939–1955
 Edith Mountain 1958–1974
Nina Crone 1975–1994
 Christine Briggs 1995–2007
 Catherine Misson 2008–2018
 Toni Meath 2019–present

Campuses 
The Junior Years (Prep - Year 4) learning environment is located at the Morris Hall campus on Caroline Street, while the Early Learning Centre (3- and 4-Year Old Program), the Middle Years (5-8) and Senior Years (Years 9-12) are all located at the Merton Hall campus, in Anderson Street, South Yarra.

The Merton Hall campus provides a chapel, gymnasium, library, dining hall, specialist Sport, Art, Drama and Science Centres, assembly hall, multipurpose sports fields and a rowing facility located nearby on the banks of the Yarra River. The Boarding House (which caters for approximately 90 students) is also located on the Merton Hall campus.

Wildfell, which was built in 2011 for the Middle Years Program,  includes an eLearning studio and learning studios.

Morris Hall, the Junior Years campus, incorporates learning studios, specialist art, music and science centres, an oval and sustainable gardens.

Buildings and facilities 
The School opened its Science Futures Centre in 2005, with a ceremony attended by Sir Gustav Nossal. The Science Futures Centre comprises eight laboratories, three preparation rooms, three laboratory technicians' offices and withdrawal areas. This was renamed the Christine Briggs Building in 2007 following the retirement of former Principal, Christine Briggs.

The most recent additions to the campus include the Artemis Centre (2017) and the St Hilda’s garden (2021).  

The Artemis Centre revolutionised the way that in which the School conceives and delivers its health, fitness and wellbeing programs.  Dedicated features of the Centre enable the development of fitness and flexibility in Grammarians from as young as three years of age, while the pool, dance and yoga rooms, and the gym recognise the changing needs of young people by promoting wellbeing and a regimen that encourages lifelong exercise and fitness for all ages.

Learning spaces, designed for independent study and small group collaboration, complete the environment and highlight the characteristics of a contemporary, agile and interconnected society we see in tertiary learning and in leading organisations. This building has most recently been complemented with gardens, at the opposing end of the campus, designed for relaxation, reflection and renewal. They offer a quiet sanctuary for Middle Years students to enjoy, but also serve as a reminder of sustainable practices and an appreciation of nature and the environment.

As the School continues to extend its programs and addresses the challenges of educating girls for the future, it will continue to review, innovate, design and update its buildings and facilities. In 2021, in line with the School’s strategic vision, a Strategic Planning Framework was commissioned for the Anderson and Caroline Street sites from leading world renowned architectural firm ARM.

Academics 
Melbourne Girls Grammar offers Victorian Certificate of Education (VCE) for its students at Years 11 to 12, with some students beginning their VCE studies in Year 10.

House system 
The house system involves many students in a variety of student competitions from sport to art, music, drama, debating and public speaking. The houses run across Morris and Merton Halls and are: T

 Blackwood
 Clarke: red, named after Archbishop Lowther Clarke, who was a major influence in the early development of girls’ education within the Church of England framework 
 Hensley: pink, commemorates one of the two first headmistresses of the school - Emily Hensley
 Mungo: green, named after ‘St Mungo’, the house in Domain Road where the school first opened in 1893 
 Taylor: blue, commemorates the other of the first two headmistresses of the School - Alice Taylor.

^ In 2021, led by the Student Executive Council (SEC) a referendum was conducted. The result was the decision to adopt a new name for this House in 2022.

Sport 
Melbourne Girls Grammar is a member of Girls Sport Victoria (GSV).

Notable alumnae

Education

 Margaret Loch Kiddle (1933) – Historian 
 Sally Walker AM (1972) – Vice Chancellor of Deakin University

Community and philanthropy

 Gladys Buntine OBE (Spurling 1918) – Girl Guides Commissioner 
 Vera Deakin White OBE (1909) – Red Cross worker 

Entertainment, media, and the arts

 Beryl Bryant (1909)– Theatre owner and actress  
 Caroline Craig (1992) – Actress 
 Caroline Wilson (1977) – AFL journalist and television presenter 
 Fay Zwicky (1950) – Poet  
 Helen Gifford OAM (1952) – Composer  
 Jill Garner (1977) – Victorian Government Architect  
 Kate Alexa (2005) – Singer 
 Stephanie McIntosh (2003) – Singer and actress 

Medicine and science

 Lucy Meredith Bryce CBE (1914) – Haematologist 
 Mary Ellinor Lucy Archer  MBE (1912) – Librarian and scientist 
 Margaret Blackwood (1927) MBE, DBE – Botanist  
 Nancy Millis MBE, AC (1939) – Microbiologist 
 June Howqua MBBS, MD – Cardiologist 

Olympians and Paralympians

 Amber Parkinson (1993) – Beijing 2008 – Fencing
 Angela Darby (2004)– Beijing 2008 – Modern Pentathlon – Rhodes Scholar 2012
 Danni Roche OAM (1987) - Atlanta 1996 – Hockey
 Isis Holt (2019)  – 2016 Paralympics and 2020 Paralympics  –  Athletics
 Jacqui Marshall (1974) – Los Angeles 1984 – Rowing
 Joscelin Yeo Wei Ling (1997) – Barcelona 1992, Atlanta 1996, Sydney 2000 and Athens 2004 – Swimming 
 Kitty Chiller AM (1981) – Sydney 2000 – Modern Pentathlon and later Olympic Chef de Mission in 2016 – first female Australian to hold the role
 Sarah D'Arcy (1993) – Sydney 2000 – Swimming
 Sarah Hammond (1993)– Sydney 2000 – Handball
 Sarah Sauvey (2001)– Vancouver 2010 Winter Olympics – Ski Cross

Sports

 Abbie McKay (2018) – AFLW – Carlton Football Club 
 Bonnie Toogood (2015) – AFLW – Western Bulldogs 
 Eliza McNamara (2020) – AFLW – Melbourne Football Club
 Olivia Vesely (2017) – AFLW – St Kilda 
 Phoebe McWilliams (2003) – AFLW – Geelong Football Club – Greater Western Sydney

Associated schools
Melbourne Girls Grammar School is the sister school of Melbourne Grammar School, with which it has a strong association, as the two stream productions, formals, workshops and concerts together. The student bases also enjoy a strong association throughout the secondary years as many MGGS girls attend Grimwade House (Melbourne Grammar School's co-educational primary campus).

See also
Anglican Church of Australia

References

Further reading 
 McCarthy, R. and Theobald, M.R. 1993. Melbourne Girls Grammar School Centenary Essays 1893–1993. Hyland House, Melbourne. .

External links 
MGGS website
Girls Sport Victoria

Girls' schools in Victoria (Australia)
Boarding schools in Victoria (Australia)
Educational institutions established in 1893
Anglican schools in Melbourne
Junior School Heads Association of Australia Member Schools
1893 establishments in Australia
Alliance of Girls' Schools Australasia
Buildings and structures in the City of Melbourne (LGA)